Jacinta Anne Brondgeest,  Jacinta, is an Australian-American singer, songwriter, musician, music producer, and electronic dance music artist. She was born on 5th of December, 1965. She struggled at the beginning of her life being born in  a male body. She felt trapped in a body that wasn't hers, until she had the reassignment surgery in 1990.

Life and career

Jacinta Brondgeest was born in Portland, Oregon but grew up in Sydney. She started her musical career working in local bands. Her debut solo album, Sandalwood: Under the Influence, appeared in 2000. She wrote the track, "Wonderland", which was recorded for The Saddle Club, an Australian-Canadian children's TV show. As a single it peaked at No. 7 on the Australian Singles Chart in September 2003. "Wonderland" spent 11 weeks on the AIR Independent Charts, peaking at #2, October 13, 2003.

After moving to Austin, Texas, to try her luck in the States, in 2005 Jacinta issued her second album, Smokescreen, whose first single, "Sunshine", had its own album of remixes that came out the same year. "Destination" followed in 2006, then top 10 Billboard Dance Hit "Can’t Keep It a Secret" in 2007, and "Electric Universe" in 2008.

Billboard Magazine Chart Hits—In 2006, "Sunshine" rose to #20 on the Billboard Hot Club Play Chart, and in that same year, "Destination" climbed to #23.
In 2007, "Can't Keep It a Secret" climbed to #7 on the Billboard Hot Club Play Chart.

Her debut on the European Dance scene came in 2009 with "Share the Tears" by AurA and "Lost in a Dream" by Javah both featuring Jacinta’s vocals.

Jacinta has played an artist showcase during the 2011 SXSWmusic conference in Austin Texas, March 18, 2011.

Awards

In March 2008, Jacinta was a nominee for Best Break-Through Artist at The WMC (Winter Music Conference) International Dance Music Awards, and in 2010 won first place in the USA Songwriting Competition for her song "Can't Keep It a Secret" (Dance/Electronica category). Jacinta is a 2010 finalist (with her song "Electric Universe") in the International Songwriting Competition (ISC).

Discography
 PEACE BE WITH YOU - released on Bill Friar Entertainment, Oct 17, 2015 
 BETTER WAY - released on King Street Sounds, Aug 15, 2013 
 CALM BEFORE THE STORM - released on Tactal Hots, Dec 15, 2012 
 SOMEWHERE OVER THE RAINBOW - released on CAPP Records, Oct 7, 2010
 ALWAYS BESIDE ME - released on Destune Records, Sept 1, 2010
 MAGIC - released on CAPP Records, Feb 26, 2010
 LUMINA - Songs of Light from the Dark Hours – 9 tracks - released on Chunky Music, Dec 14, 2009.
 LOST IN A DREAM (Javah f/Jacinta) released on Spinnin' Records, Nov, 2009.
 SHARE THE TEARS (AurA f/Jacinta) released on Five Star Records, 2009
 PAST LIFE MEDITATION (Jacinta & Psychic Norbert) released on Chunky Music, 2009.
 DAY IN TIME (WildJaam f/Jacinta and Amber Dirks) released on Chunky Music/Power2Move, Feb 4, 2009.
 I SEE FIRE (Cybersutra f/ Jacinta) - released on Kult Records Jan 6 2009
 ELECTRIC UNIVERSE - The Definitive Remixes - released on Chunky Music Oct 24, 2008
 ELECTRIC UNIVERSE - released on Chunky Music Oct 10, 2008
 CAN'T KEEP IT A SECRET -  The Secret Remixes, released on Chunky Music July 2007
 CAN'T KEEP IT A SECRET, released on Chunky Music June 5, 2007
 DESTINATION, 10 remixes on mega single, released on Chunky Music May 2006
 DESTINATION: CLUB CUTZ, 6 remixes and acapellas, released on Chunky Music July 2006
 SUNSHINE, 9 remixes on mega single, released on Chunky Music October 2005
 SMOKESCREEN, released on Chunky Music 2005.
 SANDALWOOD ~ UNDER THE INFLUENCE, released on Chunky Music 2000.
 DEDICATED TO A STRANGER, limited release, 1996

References

External links
 
 Chunky Music
 Sonicbids

Musicians from Portland, Oregon
Living people
Australian women pop singers
American women pop singers
Year of birth missing (living people)
Singers from Oregon
21st-century American women